Alipate Qetaki is a Fijian lawyer, businessman, civil servant, and a former politician, who served as Attorney-General from May 1987 to September 1987 and against as Attorney General and Minister for Justice in the interim Cabinet formed by Laisenia Qarase in the wake of the Fiji coup of 2000.  He held office till an elected government took power in September 2001.

He served as executive chairman of both the Fiji Law Reform Commission (from 2003) and the Fiji Law Revision Commission.

In August 2008, Qetaki was appointed by the military regime of Frank Bainimarama to the post of General Manager of the Native Land Trust Board, replacing Semi Tabakanalagi, who died in office. He held this position till April 2015, when he was succeeded by Tevita Kuruvakadua. He has also been a Director of Fiji Sugar Corp. Ltd since 26 November 2008.

He is a former student of Lelean Memorial and Queen Victoria Schools in Fiji and holds an LLM from the University of Edinburgh.

References

External links
Fiji Law Reform Commission
Native Lands Trust Board Fiji Islands

Year of birth missing (living people)
Living people
People educated at Lelean Memorial School
People educated at Queen Victoria School (Fiji)
Alumni of the University of Edinburgh
Attorneys-general of Fiji
Fijian civil servants
Fijian businesspeople